Ethnic violence  is a form of  political violence which is expressly motivated by ethnic hatred and ethnic conflict. Forms of ethnic violence which can be argued to have the characteristics of terrorism may be known as ethnic terrorism or ethnically motivated terrorism. 
"Racist terrorism" is a form of ethnic violence which is dominated by overt racism and xenophobic reactionism.

Ethnic violence which is perpetrated in an organized, sustained form is known as ethnic conflict or ethnic warfare (race war), in contrast to class conflict, where the dividing line is social class rather than ethnic background.

Care must be taken to distinguish ethnic violence, which is violence which is motivated by an ethnic division, from violence that is motivated by other factors and just happens to break out between members of different ethnic groups (political or ideological).

Violent ethnic rivalry is the subject matter of Jewish sociologist Ludwig Gumplowicz's Der Rassenkampf ("Struggle of the Races", 1909); and more recently, it is the subject matter of Amy Chua's notable study, World On Fire: How Exporting Free Market Democracy Breeds Ethnic Hatred and Global Instability.
Some academicians would classify all "nationalist-based violence" as ethnic violence, a classification which would include the World Wars and all of the major conflicts between industrialised nations which occurred during the 19th century.

Causality and characteristics
There are various potential causes of ethnic violence. Research which has been conducted by the New England Complex Systems Institute (NESCI) has shown that violence results when ethnic groups are partially mixed: neither clearly separated enough to reduce contact nor thoroughly mixed enough to build common bonds.  According to Dr. May Lim, a researcher who is affiliated with NECSI, "Violence normally occurs when a group is large enough to impose cultural norms on public spaces, but not large enough to prevent those norms from being broken. Usually this occurs in places where boundaries between ethnic or cultural groups are unclear."

This theory also states that the minimum requirement for ethnic tensions to result in ethnic violence on a systemic level is a heterogeneous society and the lack of a power to prevent them from fighting. In the ethnic conflicts that erupted after the end of the Cold War, this lack of outer controls is seen as the cause; Since there was no longer a strong centralized power (in the form of the USSR) to control the various ethnic groups, they then had to provide defense for themselves. This implies that once ethnicity is established, there needs to be strong distinctions, otherwise violence is inevitable.

Another theory supports the belief that a general feeling that security is lacking can cause ethnic violence, particularly when different ethnic groups live in proximity to each other. This feeling can eventually cause different ethnic groups to distrust each other, which leads to their unwillingness to peacefully coexist with each other.

The emotions that tend to cause ethnic tensions, which can lead to ethnic violence, are fear, hate, resentment, and rage. Individual identities might change throughout the years, but strong emotional issues can lead to a desire to fulfill those needs above all other concerns. This strong desire to satisfy individual needs, without harming your own group, can have violent results.

Assuming that ethnic groups can be defined as groups of people which band together in order to protect material goods, while they are also satisfying the need to feel that they are a part of a group, violence which results from ethnicity can be a result of a violation which is committed against either ethnic group. However, violence occurs when the members of the opposing groups believe that there is no peaceful solution to the tensions which are plaguing them.

Another theory states that ethnic violence is the result of past tensions. Referring to the members of the other ethnic group based solely on their previous offences tends to increase the probability of future violence. This is referenced in the literature on ethnic violence that tends to focus on areas that have already had a history of ethnic violence, instead of comparing them with areas that have had peaceful ethnic relations.

Ethnic violence obviously does not exist in exactly the same conditions in every example. Whereas one case of ethnic violence might result in a drawn out genocide, another case might result in a race riot. Different issues lead to different levels of intensity of violence. The problem mainly comes down to issues of group security. In situations when offensive and defensive actions are indistinguishable to outsiders, and in situations when the offensive actions are more effective in insuring group survival, then violence is sure to be present and harsh. This view of ethnic violence placed risk in areas where members of ethnic groups feel insecure about their future, not as a result of emotional tensions.

Ethnic violence frequently occurs as a result of individual domestic disputes which spiral out of control and lead to large-scale conflicts. When individual disputes occur between two members of different ethnic groups, they can result in peace or they can result in more violence. Peace is more likely when offended persons feel that the offenders will be sufficiently punished by members of their own ethnic group. Or peace is simply achieved through the fear of greater ethnic violence. If the fear of retribution or the fear of violence is not present, ethnic violence may occur.

Because ethnic violence is particularly extreme, there are numerous theories on how it can be prevented, and once it starts, there are numerous theories on how it can be ended. At the New England Complex Systems Institute, Yaneer Bar-Yam suggests that "clear boundaries" or "thorough mixing" can reduce the possibility of violence, citing Switzerland as an example.

Unfortunately, poorly planned separations do not lead to peace between members of different ethnic groups.  the religious separation which occurred between India and Pakistan left large heterogeneous populations in India and since the separation, violence has occurred.

The United States is often presented as the classic "melting pot" of ethnicities. "Ethnic" tensions in the United States are more typically viewed in terms of race.

Using the media to change perceptions of ethnicity might lead to a change in the probability of ethnic violence. The use of media that results in ethnic violence is usually a cyclical relationship; one group increases messages of group cohesion in response to a perceived threat, and a neighboring group responds with messages of their own group cohesion. Of course, this only happens when outside groups are already perceived as being potential threats. Using this logic, ethnic violence might be prevented by decreasing messages of group cohesion, while increasing messages of safety and solidarity with members of other ethnic groups.

Outside forces may also be effective in decreasing the likelihood of ethnic violence. However, not all interferences by outside forces may be helpful. If not handled delicately, the possibility might increase. Outside groups can help stabilize danger zones by imposing gentle economic sanctions, develop more representative political institutions that would allow for minority voices to be heard, and encourage the respect of ethnically diverse communities and minorities.  However, if done incorrectly, outside interference can cause a nationalistic lash-back.

Types
The "Ancient Hatreds" type of ethnic violence associates modern ethnic conflicts with ancient (or even mythical) conflicts. the ethnic cleansing which was perpetrated by Serbs in the 1990s was seen as revenge for the rule of the Croatian Ustashe, and the massacres of Bosnian Muslims were inflamed by the deeply rooted hatred of the Ottoman Empire

Examples

Ethnic cleansing and genocide qualify as "ethnic violence" (of the most extreme sorts), because by definition, the victims of a genocide are usually killed based on their membership in a particular ethnic group.
 Genocides in history
 List of ethnic cleansing campaigns
 List of genocides by death toll 
Circassian genocide
Herero and Namaqua genocide
Armenian genocide
Assyrian genocide
Bihari genocide
Great Famine of Mount Lebanon
Greek genocide
Holodomor
Genocide of Serbs in the Independent State of Croatia
The Holocaust
Romani Holocaust
Bengali genocide
Cambodian genocide
East Timor genocide
Kurdish genocide
Bosnian genocide
Rwandan genocide
Darfur genocide
Rohingya genocide
Uyghur genocide
Amhara genocide
Persecution of Shias by the Islamic State
Genocide of Yazidis by the Islamic State
Chechen genocide
Native American genocide in California
Other examples of ethnic violence include:
 Antisemitic  pogroms in European history
 Foiba massacres in Dalmatia
 Muhajir genocides
 Ethnic violence in Konso in Ethiopia since 1994
 Ethnic violence against Amaro Koore in Ethiopia since 1994
 War crime against the Afar people in Ethiopia from 2021 to 2022
 Oromo-Somali clashes in Ethiopia in 2017
 Ethnic violence in South Sudan
 Sudanese nomadic conflicts
Race riots and racial supremacist violence in the United States
 The Order, United States
Lynching in the United States
 Ku Klux Klan, United States
Black Legion (political movement)
 Hammerskins, International
 Death Angels, United States
 Don Black (nationalist) and Operation Red Dog
 Crown Heights riot, United States
Race riots in the United Kingdom
Oldham Riots
Bradford Riots
Combat 18, United Kingdom
 The history of Native Americans in the United States; American Indian Wars, Trail of Tears
 Cronulla Race Riots in Sydney, 2005
Ethnic conflicts in the Russian federation and the Caucasus
 The Dashnaks, EOKA and Czarist Russia
 The Russo-Circassian War
 The 2006 Moscow market bombing, Russia
 Riots in Kondopoga, Karelia, Russia in 2006

Other secessionist conflicts
The Yugoslav Wars and the history of ethnic conflicts in the Balkans
 Serb Paramilitary groups i.e. Arkan's White tigers and many more
 The Croatian Ustaše which was led by Ante Pavelić
The Kurdish–Turkish conflict
 The Azanian People's Liberation Army, South Africa
 Mouvement de Libération Nationale du Québec
 Numerous individual "hate crime" incidents, e.g. Hedvig Malina

Some of the world's ongoing conflicts are, however, fought along religious rather than ethnic lines; one such conflict is the Somali Civil War.
The Guatemalan Civil War was fought along ideological lines (leftist rebel groups fought against the Guatemalan government) but it acquired ethnic characteristics because the rebels were primarily supported by the indigenous Mayan groups.

Terrorism against Copts in Egypt qualifies as both ethnic and religious violence but it isn't occurring during an ongoing conflict, instead, it reflects a history of sporadic and continuous attacks, over the years.

See also
 Classicide
 Communal violence
 Crimes against humanity
 Democide
 Extrajudicial killing
 Extrajudicial punishment
 Gendercide
 Genocide
 Hate crime
 Hate group
 Lynching
 Pogrom
 Political violence
 Politicide
 Religious violence
 Terrorism
 Vigilantism
 War crime

References

External links
 New England Complex Systems Institute

Racially motivated violence
Violence